Yuna Kim (born September 5, 1990), also credited in eastern name order as Kim Yuna or Kim Yeon-a, is a retired South Korean competitive figure skater. She is the 2010 Olympic champion, the 2014 Olympic silver medalist, a two-time World champion (2009, 2013) the  2009 Four Continents champion, a three-time Grand Prix Final champion, the  2006 World Junior champion, the  2005 Junior Grand Prix Final champion, and a six-time (2003, 2004, 2005, 2006, 2013, 2014) South Korean national champion.

Kim is the first South Korean figure skater to win a medal at an ISU Junior Grand Prix or ISU Grand Prix of Figure Skating event, the ISU Figure Skating Championships, and the Olympic Games. She is the first female skater ever to win every major international competition, namely, the Olympic Games, the World Championships, the Four Continents Championships, and the Grand Prix Final. She is also the first figure skater ever to complete a Super Slam, having won every major senior and junior competition. She is one of the most highly recognized athletes and media figures in South Korea. As a result of her numerous accomplishments and popularity, she is frequently referred to as Queen Yuna by various media across the world.

She is the former record holder for ladies in the short program, free skate and combined total under the ISU Judging System. She has broken world record scores 11 times under the ISU Judging System since 2007, eight of which being records she herself set. She is also the first female skater to surpass the 140-point and 150-point free skating mark and the 200-point, 210-point and 220-point total mark, as well as the first and only figure skater to have never finished off the podium in her entire career under the current ISU Judging System. She has been beaten by only seven skaters throughout her career. Due to her strong artistry, musicality, skating skills, mental strength, and solid and consistent competitive record, she is regarded as one of the greatest figure skaters of all time. She is also noted for her great rivalry with three-time World champion Mao Asada from Japan.

Kim was the highest paid athlete at the 2010 Winter Olympics, and the fifth, seventh, sixth and fourth top-earning sportswoman in the world in 2010, 2012, 2013 and 2014 respectively according to Forbes. The business magazine has also listed her in their 30 under 30 and Philanthropy lists. She was included in Time magazine's annual Time 100 of World's Most Influential People in 2010. Kim was the first to top Forbes Korea Power Celebrity and was ranked in the top 10 from 2009 to 2015 and in 2018.

Early life and education
Kim was born on September 5, 1990, in Gyeonggi-do, to Kim Hyeon-seok, a business owner, and Park Mi-hee. She has an older sister named Ae-ra. Her mother took an active role in her skating career from the beginning, driving her to the ice rink each day and acting as her manager and spokesperson. She played English cassette tapes in the car to help improve her language skills. Kim's family often struggled to fund her skating expenses, and when her father's business wasn't doing well enough to pay for her lessons, they put their house up as collateral to the bank. Kim went to Dojang Middle School, though she stopped attending classes after joining the national team, and later Suri High School in Gunpo. She graduated from Korea University in 2013 with a degree in Physical Education.

The correct transliteration of her name, would be "Kim Yeon-a". However, when Kim applied for her passport, the official miswrote her name as "Yu-na", which is written as "" rather than "". From the 2010–2011 season, her name was registered as "Yuna Kim" at her International Skating Union profile, and she has requested media to be referred to in English using western name order as "Yuna Kim" instead of "Kim Yu-na".

Competitive career

Early career
Kim began skating at the age of five. Her coach at the time, Ryu Jong-hyun, strongly suggested to Kim's mother that Kim should continue to skate, predicting that she would become a world-class figure skater in the future. In a 2011 interview, she gave credit to her coaches for noticing her aptitude for skating, stating that her coaches told her that her body was perfect for skating. She added "I was born with a good instrument, maybe more so than the talent", and credited her coaches with helping her to develop her skating.

During Kim's junior years, South Korea had limited facilities for figure skaters. In an October 2010 interview with CNN, she pointed out that there were not many ice rinks in Korea, and that the few rinks that existed were public. She went on to add, "Even now, when athletes want to practice, they have to use the rink very early [in the] morning or late at night", further describing how there weren't enough ice rinks to facilitate all the figure skating teams, which led to skaters having to train in different rinks from day to day, and that there was a high possibility of injury due to the rinks being too cold. Kim trained in the USA for her distinguishing jumps, choosing to train abroad because of the general practice circumstances in Korea. She described how her coach used a harness to teach her how to jump a triple toe loop in the same interview. As proper skate shops were also lacking, Kim frequently had to wear ill-fitting skates in her teenage years, making it hard for her to balance and resulting in many injuries.

In 2002, Kim competed internationally for the first time at the Triglav Trophy in Slovenia, where she won the gold medal in the novice competition. A year later, at age 12, she won the senior title at the South Korean Championships, becoming the youngest skater ever to do so. She won her second international competition at the Golden Bear of Zagreb, a novice competition. She continued her reign as the South Korean champion between 2003 and 2006.

Junior career

2004–2005 season: Junior debut
In the 2004–2005 season, Kim competed as a junior on the ISU Junior Grand Prix. She won a gold medal at her first competition in Hungary and became the first Korean skater to win a Junior Grand Prix event. At her second competition in China, Kim was in fourth place after an error-laden short program, but rebounded in the free skate to take second place overall. This qualified her for a spot in the 2004–2005 Junior Grand Prix Final, where she won the silver medal with an overall score of 137.75 points. She retained her national title for the third year in a row on her way to the 2005 World Junior Championships. At that competition, she won the silver medal with 158.93 points, and landed her first triple-triple combination jump in the free skate.

2005–2006 season: Junior World champion
For the 2005–2006 season, Kim was not old enough to compete at the 2006 Olympics. Instead, she competed in the 2005–2006 Junior Grand Prix and won both of her competitions in Bulgaria and Slovakia. At the 2005–2006 Junior Grand Prix Final, she won the competition 28.34 points ahead of silver medalist Aki Sawada. During her free skate, she landed seven triple jumps, including a triple flip-triple toe loop combination and a double Axel-triple toe loop combination. Kim won her fourth senior national title. At the 2006 World Junior Championships, she won the gold medal scoring 177.54 points overall, with a 24.19-point margin of victory over silver medalist Mao Asada.

Senior career

2006–2007 season: Senior debut and World medal

To prepare for her senior debut in the 2006–2007 season, Kim trained extensively with Brian Orser at the Toronto Cricket, Skating and Curling Club in Canada during the summer of 2006. Kim made her senior international debut at the 2006 Skate Canada where she won a bronze medal after placing first at the short program and fourth in the free skate, with a total overall score of 168.48 points. At the 2006 Trophée Eric Bompard, Kim placed first in both the short program and free skating, and won the event with a total of 184.54 points, 10.10 points ahead of silver medalist Miki Ando. 

Her Grand Prix performances qualified Kim for her first Grand Prix Final, the 2006 Grand Prix Final in Saint Petersburg, Russia. Kim placed third in the short program and first in the free skating, winning the Grand Prix Final earning 184.20 points, with a margin of 11.68 over silver medalist Mao Asada. Following this, Kim was forced to withdraw due to an injury from the 2007 South Korean Championships and was unable to defend her national title. In January 2007, she was diagnosed as being in the early stages of lumbar disc herniation (L4~L5).

Kim was selected to compete at the 2007 World Championships in Tokyo based on her performance during the season. During the event, Kim won the short program with 71.95 points, setting the highest short program score ever under the ISU Judging System. She fell on both her triple Lutzes during the free skate and executed a triple Salchow-double toe loop combination which received no credit as it was deemed a fourth combination. She finished fourth in the segment, and third overall, behind Miki Ando and Mao Asada. Kim's placement qualified South Korea two ladies entries for the 2008 World Figure Skating Championships. In March 2007, satisfied with the training environment in Toronto, Kim made it her training home, and Orser became her new full-time coach. She was Orser's first real student.

2007–2008 season: Second world medal
Kim was assigned to the 2007 Cup of China and the 2007 Cup of Russia for the 2007–2008 Grand Prix season. She started the season by winning the 2007 Cup of China with a total score of 180.68 points, 24.34 points ahead of silver medalist Caroline Zhang. She landed a triple flip-single toe loop combination, a triple Lutz, and a double Axel and placed third in the short program. In the free skate, she hit a triple flip-triple toe loop combination, a triple loop, triple Lutz-double toe loop combination, double Axel-triple toe loop combination, a single Lutz, a triple Salchow, a double Axel and three level-four spins to score 122.36 points. At the 2007 Cup of Russia, Kim won the short program scoring 63.50 points and the free skate with 133.70 points, finishing first overall with 197.20 points, 24.43 ahead of silver medalist Yukari Nakano, and set a world record for the free skate score under the ISU Judging System. She executed a triple flip-triple toe loop, a triple loop, a triple Lutz-double toe loop, a double Axel-triple toe loop, a triple Lutz, a triple Salchow, and a double Axel.

Kim qualified for the 2007–2008 Grand Prix Final in Turin, Italy. She won the short program with 64.62 points and placed second in the free skate with 132.21 points. With a total score of 196.83 points, Kim won her second Grand Prix Final. She was not required to participate in the 2008 South Korean Championships due to her previous results. A hip injury prevented her from competing at the 2008 Four Continents Championships. Despite a persistent hip injury and back pain, Kim competed at the 2008 World Championships in Gothenburg, Sweden. She was placed fifth in the short program with 59.85 points, but rebounded in the free skate to win the program with 123.38. She scored 183.23 points overall, and won her second consecutive bronze medal at the World Championships. Despite being injured and not near her best, some believed she was unfairly scored in the free skate.

2008–2009 season: First World title

Kim was assigned to the 2008 Skate America and the 2008 Cup of China for the 2008–2009 Grand Prix season. At the 2008 Skate America, Kim placed first in the short program with a score of 69.50, leading by 11.70 points despite trouble with her double Axel. She captured the ladies' title, winning the free skate with a score of 123.95, and earned 193.45 points overall, more than 20 points ahead of silver medalist Yukari Nakano. She won the 2008 Cup of China, where she received a score of 63.64 in the short program and 128.11 in the free skate, placing first in both. The combined total of 191.75 was nearly 21 points ahead of silver medalist Miki Ando. 

Her performances qualified her for a trip to the Grand Prix Final, which was held in Goyang, South Korea. She was placed first in the short program with 65.94 points and second in the free skate where she earned 120.41 points. She won the silver medal with a total score of 186.35 points, 2.20 behind Mao Asada. Kim then competed in the 2009 Four Continents in Vancouver, British Columbia, Canada. She set a new world record of 72.24 points in the short program with a clean performance. She scored 116.83 in the free skating program, keeping the lead with 189.07 points overall and winning the gold medal.

During the 2009 World Championships, held in Los Angeles, United States, she set another new world record of 76.12 points in the short program, surpassing her previous record by almost four points. She won the free skate, and set a new world record total score of 207.71, winning her first World Championship title, as well as becoming the first female skater to surpass 200 points under the ISU Judging System.

2009–2010 season: Super Slam

Kim was assigned to the 2009 Trophée Eric Bompard and the 2009 Skate America in the 2009–2010 ISU Grand Prix season. At the Trophée Eric Bompard, she placed first in the short program with the score of 76.08 points, 16.44 points ahead of Yukari Nakano. She successfully executed a triple Lutz-triple toe loop combination, followed by a triple flip and a double Axel. Her spiral sequence and all three spins received level fours. Opening with a triple Lutz-triple toe loop combination and showing great artistic skills, she won the free skate with 133.95 points. She also executed a double Axel-double toe loop-double loop, a double Axel-triple toe loop, a triple Salchow, a triple Lutz and a double Axel. She won the event with 210.03 points, 36.04 ahead of silver medalist Mao Asada. Kim set world records for the free skate and the overall score under the ISU Judging System at a competition.

At the 2009 Skate America, Kim placed first again after the short program with the score of 76.28, 17.48 points ahead of her closest competitor Rachael Flatt. She received +2.20 grade of execution for her triple Lutz-triple toe loop combination, the highest ever given for jumps by the ISU in ladies' figure skating, under the historical +3 GOE system. She placed second in the free skate with the score of 111.70 points, due to mistakes in her jumps. She won the event with 187.98 points, beating silver medalist Rachael Flatt with a lead of 13.07. She also set a new world record again for the short program under the ISU Judging System.

Her victories in both Grand Prix events qualified her for the 2009–2010 Grand Prix Final in Tokyo, Japan, in December 2009. She placed second in the short program with 65.64 points, 0.56 behind Miki Ando. The next day, she won the free skate with 123.22 points. As a result, Kim won her third Grand Prix Final title with a total of 188.86 points.

In February 2010, Kim competed in the ladies event at the 2010 Winter Olympic Games, where she won Olympic gold, thereby completing her Super Slam. In March 2010, Kim competed at the 2010 World Championships in Turin, Italy. Kim said she had struggled with finding the motivation to compete at the World Championships after winning the gold medal at the Olympic Games. Kim placed seventh in the short program with 60.30 points. She opened with a triple Lutz-triple toe loop combination, but had problems with her layback spin and spiral sequence. She rebounded in the free skate to win the program with 130.49 points, and won the silver medal with a total of 190.79 points.

2010 Winter Olympics: Gold medal

In February 2010, Kim competed in the ladies event at the 2010 Winter Olympic Games, held in Vancouver, British Columbia, Canada. She entered the Games as a strong favorite to win the gold. In the short program on February 23, she executed a triple Lutz-triple toe loop combination, a triple flip and a double Axel. Her spirals and her spins were graded a level four. Her technical score of 44.70 points was the highest ever. She also earned 33.80 points in the program components. As a result, Kim scored 78.50 points, taking the lead by 4.72 over Mao Asada of Japan and achieving her best score in the short program. She set a new world record.

On February 25, Kim won the free skate with a new record of 150.06 points, setting a new world record for the free skate. She landed a triple Lutz-triple toe loop combination, a triple flip, a double Axel-double toe loop-double loop combination, a double Axel-triple toe loop combination, a triple Salchow, a triple Lutz and a double Axel as well as receiving level fours for her spins and her spiral sequence. Her technical score of 78.30 and her presentation score of 71.76 were both the highest of the segment. She was the only competitor to earn nines in her program components scores. Overall, Kim totaled 228.56 points, shattering her own personal best and previous world record by a margin of 18 points, which became the longest standing record performance. She won the gold medal, becoming the first South Korean skater to medal in any discipline of figure skating at the Olympic Games. She also set a new Olympic record. Kim's gold medal was South Korea's first medal at the Winter Olympics in a sport other than speed skating or short track.

Kim's short program, free skate and combined total scores in the 2010 Winter Olympics in Vancouver were the highest scores ever since the ISU Judging System was created, and were automatically registered in the Guinness World Records. Sonia Bianchetti called her Olympic routines some of the greatest in figure skating history. After the 2010 Winter Olympics Jacques Rogge and Hillary Clinton praised Kim's Olympic performance.

2010–2011 and 2011–2012 seasons: Coaching change and hiatus

In August 2010, Kim and her coach of four years, Brian Orser, parted ways. Their split was first made known to the public by Orser's press release. Orser's dismissal was reported as "sudden and unexpected" and no explanation was given for the split. Orser made the separation public, saying he did not want it to become a distraction for his other skaters, including Americans Adam Rippon and Christina Gao. Rippon said in an interview that they had known about the situation longer than the general public, and had had time to deal with it, noting that "it hasn't affected Brian's coaching, and it certainly hasn't affected my training". 

Kim posted an online message accusing Orser of lying. She stated on her official website that they had been maintaining an awkward and ambiguous relationship for months and that she was perplexed by Orser's announcement. She also said that the dismissal had been her decision and that the reason behind it did not need to be made public. After the split, Orser gave several interviews regarding the end of their collaboration. On August 25, 2010, Orser caused controversy by revealing Kim's 2010–2011 competitive program information to the press without Kim and her choreographer's consent. Soon after, Kim left the rink where she had trained with Orser to train at the East West Ice Palace in Los Angeles owned by Michelle Kwan and Kwan's family. On October 5, 2010, Peter Oppegard was announced as Kim's coach.

Kim was assigned to the 2010 Cup of China and to the 2010 Cup of Russia for the 2010–2011 ISU Grand Prix season. However, she chose not to compete in the Grand Prix series to focus on the 2011 World Championships. She won the silver medal at the event after being placed first in the short program and second in the free skate with a total score of 194.50 points, 1.29 points behind Miki Ando.

Kim said she might miss the next Grand Prix series due to her work promoting South Korea's successful bid for the 2018 Winter Olympics. In May 2011, Kim told Around the Rings that bringing the Winter Olympics to Pyeongchang would be an inspiration to young athletes in Korea. She officially announced she would be sitting out the entire 2011–2012 season on October 18, 2011.

2012–2013 season: Second World title

On July 2, 2012, Kim announced her intention to skate competitively in the 2012–13 season, with the ultimate goal of skating in the 2014 Winter Olympics. However, Kim was not invited to skate on the 2012–13 Grand Prix circuit, so she decided to participate in minor events to score enough technical points to qualify for the 2013 World Championships.

Kim left Oppegard and started training with her childhood coaches Shin Hea-sook and Ryu Jong-hyun. Her first competition of the season was the 2012 NRW Trophy which was held in Dortmund, Germany, from December 5–9, 2012. She competed at the event to earn the minimum score required for Championship events. Kim placed first in the short program with a score of 72.27 points and also won the free skate with 129.34 to claim the gold medal. With the technical qualifications met, Kim's agency said she would focus on Korean nationals and the World Championships.

In January 2013, due to her lack of competition in the previous season, Kim had to compete in the 2013 South Korean Championships to earn a spot for the 2013 World Championships. She placed first in the short program with a score of 64.97, and won the free skate with a score of 145.80, after skating a clean program. Kim won her fifth national title and qualified to compete in the World Championships.

At the 2013 World Championships, Kim placed first in the short program with a score of 69.97 points after completing a triple Lutz-triple toe loop combination, a triple flip and a double Axel, taking the lead over Carolina Kostner from Italy by 3.11 points. She also won the free skate after executing a clean program that earned 148.34 points. Her technical score of 74.73 and her presentation score of 73.61 were the highest of the night, and was the only skater of the competition to receive tens in her program components. With 218.31 points overall, Kim claimed her second world title, surpassing the rest of the competitors by 20.42 points, the largest difference between gold and silver in the nine years the ISU Judging System had been used in the World Championships. Her world title secured three spots for South Korea in the ladies event for the 2014 Winter Olympics and 2014 World Championships.

2013–2014 season: Olympic silver medal and retirement from competition

In the 2013–2014 ISU Grand Prix season, Kim was assigned to compete in the 2013 Skate Canada International and in the 2013 Trophée Eric Bompard. However, on September 26 it was announced that Kim would not compete in the Grand Prix series due to a metatarsal injury to her right foot (bruised bones) from excessive training, with recovery expected to take up to six weeks.

Kim competed in the 2013 Golden Spin of Zagreb in Zagreb, Croatia, in December 2013. She placed first in the short program with a score of 73.37 points and won the free skate with 131.12 points, despite falling on a triple Lutz. She won the gold medal with a total score of 204.49 points, beating Miki Ando of Japan by 27.67 points. In early January, Kim competed in the 2014 South Korean Championships. She led after a perfect short program with 80.60 points and won the free skate with 147.26 points. As a result, Kim won her sixth national title with a total score of 227.86 points.

In February 2014, Kim competed in the ladies event at the 2014 Winter Olympic Games, with the intention of her two programs being the farewell performances of her competitive career. She led the short program and came in second in the free skate, and finished with an Olympic silver medal. This was a source of controversy to many. Kurt Browning, four-time World champion and commentator for CBC, stated: "Yu-na Kim outskated [Sotnikova], but it's not just a skating competition anymore—it's math." American Olympic champion Dick Button stated: "Sotnikova was energetic, strong, commendable, but not a complete skater". As anticipated, Kim announced that the Olympics would mark the end of her competitive skating career.

Show skating career

Kim participated in the South Korean ice show Superstars on Ice in 2006, shortly before her senior debut, and in the Japanese show Dreams on Ice the following year. Between 2008 and 2010, she headlined Festa on Ice, produced by her former agency, IB Sports. She hosted a charity ice show, Angels on Ice, on December 25, 2008, in Seoul, appearing alongside 2008 World bronze medallist Johnny Weir and ten young South Korean figure skaters. Kim stated she wanted to show her gratitude to local fans for their support. IB Sports produced another ice show, Ice All Stars, which took place in Seoul on August 14–16, 2009. Michelle Kwan, who is Kim's idol and a five-time World champion, joined the ice show.

In April 2010, Kim left IB Sports and set up her own agency called All That Sports Corp. (AT Sports) with the support of her mother. They organized an ice show, All That Skate, which has been held annually ever since. In October 2010, Kim and her management debuted All That Skate LA, a US version of their Korean ice show brand, at the Staples Center in Los Angeles. The show, directed by Canadian choreographer David Wilson, featured Kwan, the reigning Olympic champions from three skating disciplines including Kim, and many world champions. It received positive reviews from both figure skating fans and critics for bringing a new style of skating show to the US and for overall high production quality.

In June 2012, Kim took part in Artistry on Ice in China. According to Li Sheng, president of SECA, the host of the show, it took two years to attract Kim. He added, "It's a breakthrough in Artistry on Ice, and even in China's figure skating history, although she only took part in the Shanghai stop." Kim held farewell ice shows in Seoul following her retirement from competition in 2014. She made a guest appearance in All That Skate in 2018, before returning in a starring role a year later. In 2018, she appeared in the Spanish ice show Revolution on Ice, hosted by Javier Fernández.

Skating technique
From a technical point of view, Kim is famous for her speed, ice coverage, strong jump technique, and consistency. According to Michelle Kwan, Kim is "what the judges are looking for, when it comes to jump quality, spin quality and edges." Two-time Olympic champion and skating commentator Dick Button praised Kim for her jumps, saying "She is one of the skaters that can answer, 'Where is the jump in that jump?'" He added that she had "wonderful edges, speed and flow." 

Kim landed her first triple jump at the age of 10, and within two years of that, had all her triple jumps. She landed her first triple-triple combination jump, a triple toe-triple toe, at the age of 14 at the 2005 World Junior Championships. She was also known to practice triple Axels in training. During the 2008–09 season, Kim worked on her triple loop, which had regressed due to an injury sustained before the 2008 Worlds. She also did a lot of skating skills development, with Orser's guidance.

She is well known for her signature triple-triple jump combinations including triple Lutz-triple toe loop, and triple flip-triple toe loop. She can also execute a triple Lutz-double toe loop-double loop jump combination. Another signature jump in her repertoire is a layback Ina Bauer or spread eagle that leads to a double Axel, which has been praised by skaters like Shizuka Arakawa for its speed and distance, despite jumping it directly out of the transition. Kim personally stated that her favorite jumps are the Lutz, flip, and Axel. Commentators and analysts consistently refer to her jumps as textbook standard. Her jump techniques are well praised for their high-speed entry, height, position, and quality of running edges. She has received +2.20 grade of execution for the quality of her jumps.

One of Kim's best-known moves is the bent-leg layover camel spin. Although she did not invent the move, it is sometimes called the "Yuna spin" or "Yuna camel".

Artistry

Kim's programs were often commended for combining musical interpretation with great technique. Skaters like Peggy Fleming and Michelle Kwan both praised her combination of technical elements and artistry. Yuka Sato and Robin Cousins praised Kim's star quality, command on the ice, and "it factor". David Wilson noticed Kim's ability to command an arena at 2007 Worlds. "Yuna is a chameleon", stated Wilson, further adding that "She hears music on a level that rarely people do", acknowledging that part of the reason for Kim's success was her ability to interpret the music with her programs.

Critics of the ISU judging system's point of view on artistry have also praised Kim. While Dorothy Hamill said "she will be remembered as a great artist, but it is a different kind of artistry," she still praised Kim's 2010 Olympics free skate, saying she had "jaw-dropping magnificence", and that her skating was like "magic", praising the "modernness" to her skating. Frank Carroll said she was able to combine athletics and artistry, despite it being "almost impossible" under the new judging system. In a 2017 interview, Button remarked that "Yuna Kim was elegantly moving", praising her sense of music and elegance, expressing disappointment that the rules no longer rewarded this style of skating.

Prior to the 2009–10 season, Kim said that she took up skating because she found it fun and because she thought Michelle Kwan was beautiful and wanted to be like her. The most important aspect of figure skating to her was connecting with the audience, not the color of the medal.

Collaboration with David Wilson
Kim's primary choreographer during her career was David Wilson, who provided choreography for all of her competitive programs from the 2007–08 season to her retirement in 2014. Wilson initially began working with Kim as her choreographer prior to the 2006–07 season, shortly after her 2006 Junior World Champion title. Kim had wanted to work with Wilson in 2004–05, but he declined because he'd been contacted too late in the season, so Kim worked with Jeffrey Buttle instead. When Kim contacted Wilson again two years later, Sébastien Britten, who had been working on the Junior Grand Prix circuit at the time, strongly recommended her as a skater to Wilson, leading to him accepting her as his student. Buttle had told him that Kim was "not a very happy skater", so Wilson made it his mission to make her smile and to connect with her. During this time, Brian Orser and Tracy Wilson had just taken over temporarily at the Cricket Club, and Orser had told Wilson to bring over his students to the Cricket Club, because it had private ice. He and Orser also choreographed the Festa on Ice shows. In a 2009 interview, Kim said she did not take any special acting classes to enhance her choreography, stating that all her programs were delivered by Wilson.

Wilson was contacted for All That Skate 2018, even though he had not spoken to Kim for more than three years and Kim had not skated in four years. She stated that she wanted to do something that was "pure and beautiful, not dramatic." Wilson has praised Kim's work ethic, noting that she "took everything [he] said to heart". In a different interview, he said that she believed in him, which was fulfilling, adding that she had never been rude or temperamental with him, and that she was an "absolute dream" to work with. He also praised her integrity as a person.

Program selection and construction
Kim said that acting on the ice was the most important thing for her, and that she loved performing in front of the audience. She took ballet classes during the 2007–08 season from Evelyn Hart. Though Kim was encouraged by her coaching team to look for music, Orser commented that Wilson often had the best ideas, so they would make a "sales pitch" to her in order to help her build a program. For example, during the 2007–08 season, Wilson proposed using a waltz.

After 2008 Worlds, Kim's coaching team decided it was time for her to have more input in her program music, crediting their rapport and good communication as helping with the process. Orser felt she had "come into her own in terms of maturity and development". For the 2008–09 season, Wilson and Shae-Lynn Bourne suggested several pieces to Kim for the short program, and she chose Danse Macabre by Camille Saint-Saëns. For the free skate, she chose Scheherazade by Nikolai Rimsky-Korsakov because she "was very attracted to Scheherazade four years ago after another skater used it". Kim felt classical music fit her and liked to skate to it.

The idea for the 2009–10 short program came from Sandra Bezic, who pitched Kim as a Bond girl to Wilson in 2009. "I have some ideas that I want to put out there," Kim explained. "We made together a detail of my program day by day. The black nail color is also everyone's idea." 

For the 2010–11 season, Kim wanted to do something to thank Korean fans for their support. Kim stated that using traditional Korean music as part of her program was a bit of a risk, because Chinese, Japanese and Korean music could easily sound indistinguishable to a non-Asian audience. The program focused on emotional expressions rather than performing specific movements that gave a Korean feel, and tried to convey Korean emotions to the audience. She felt the program was very modern, despite its use of traditional music. Wilson had suggested doing a Korean program previously, but she had rejected the idea because she had been concerned about the global reception. She believed that the international judges did not respond to it.

Olympic ambassador

Kim played a key role in South Korea winning the right to host the 2018 Winter Olympic Games. Originally an ambassador for South Korea's failed 2014 bid, Kim joined the Olympic Bidding Committee for Pyeongchang, the Korean hosting city. The Korean committee members, including Kim, traveled to Durban, South Africa, where the International Olympic Committee (IOC)'s decision for the hosting city was finalized on July 6, 2011. There, she fulfilled her role as a member of the Korean delegation by promoting Pyeongchang as an athlete ambassador and Olympic champion. Kim was one of the Korean delegates who appeared before the July 6 IOC conference and delivered a presentation for Pyeongchang, which won the hosting rights over the other rival cities, Munich, Germany, and Annecy, France. In October 2011, Kim was appointed a member of the 2018 Pyeongchang Olympic Winter Games Organising Committee.

On August 18, 2011, Kim was named a Global Ambassador for the Special Olympics and Goodwill Ambassador for the 2013 Special Olympics World Winter Games. In October, Kim was named an ambassador for the 2012 Winter Youth Olympics in Innsbruck. Kim stated that she hoped to become a member of the IOC after the 2014 Sochi Games. On August 27, 2015, Kim was named an ambassador for the 2016 Winter Youth Olympics in Lillehammer.

Kim was named an official ambassador for the 2018 Winter Olympics in South Korea. She appeared as the final torch bearer and lit the Olympic flame in the Opening Ceremony. She also co-starred in Coca-Cola's 2018 Winter Olympics campaign with actor Park Bo-gum. In 2020, she was appointed an ambassador for the Pyeongchang 2018 Legacy Foundation's "Play Winter" campaign, designed to promote winter sports and continue the legacy of the Pyeongchang Olympics. She served as an instructor at the Play Winter Sports Academy in 2021 and 2022, teaching high level skating and presentation skills to develop young figure skaters' talents as part of a project utilising the Pyeongchang facilities. In February 2022, she was named the honorary ambassador for the 2024 Winter Youth Olympics in Gangwon, South Korea. Kim shared in a statement that she would aim to promote Olympic values to young people around the world. Alongside her ambassador role, she will serve as a member of the Executive Committee.

In the media

Endorsements
Among Kim's official sponsors are Kookmin Bank, Nike, Korean Air, Samsung and Hyundai Motor Company. Her other endorsements include Anycall (mobile phone), Hauzen (air conditioner), Lac Vert (cosmetics), Maeil Dairies Co. Ltd (dairy products), Maxim (coffee), Saffron (fabric softener), Tous Les Jours (bakery), J. Estina (jewelry) and Qua (apparel). She is also an ambassador for French fashion house Dior.

Kim has appeared in many commercials in South Korea. Her commercial for a new touchscreen haptic phone from Samsung Electronics, dubbed "Yuna's Haptic" (SPH-W7700), sold over one million devices in a record seven months. During the 2010 Winter Olympics, Forbes magazine named Kim, along with American snowboarder Shaun White, as the top-earning athletes participating in the Olympics with $7.5 million each to their name. In August 2010, Forbes magazine listed her as one of the highest-paid female athletes in the world, with annual earnings of $9.7 million.

Since her retirement, Kim has continued to dominate the commercial scene and remains an advertising giant in South Korea. Her business followers say Kim evokes an emotional friendliness that can only be found in an athlete. A South Korean company reputation research agency says big data related to Kim contains key words like "beautiful", "doing well" and "like", while related links include "queen", "Pyeongchang" and "Olympic". They say positive responses deriving from her are 63.79 per cent. Kim is said to earn 1 billion to 1.4 billion Korean won (US$930,000 to US$1,300,000) per advertisement.

Other endeavours

Kim has worked on several projects as a singer. She recorded a duet with K-pop singer Lee Seung-gi titled "Smile Boy (Rock Ver.)", the 2010 Football World Cup commercial song. She also sang with South Korean band BigBang and rock group Transfixion on the single "The Shouts of Reds Part 2", created for the Korean World Cup soccer team. Between 2008 and 2014, Kim released four albums compiling her skating music and other favorites, beginning with Yuna Kim: Fairy on the Ice. The combined sales surpassed 100,000, a rarity for classical music.

On January 28, 2010, Kim published a book, Kim Yu-na's Seven-Minute Drama, about her experience with figure skating from the age of seven to her preparation for the 2010 Winter Olympics in Vancouver. The Chosun Ilbo stated that the book "deals with her attempts to overcome her obstacles and to become the world's top figure skater." In addition, she wrote a book called Like Yuna Kim, published on March 30, 2010. This book targets younger readers.

In May 2011, Kim began to host a program called Kim Yu-na's Kiss and Cry as part of SBS' Good Sunday. The show depicted ten celebrities learning how to figure skate from professional skaters. The contestants included comedian Kim Byung-man, singer U-Know of TVXQ, Krystal of f(x), IU, Son Dam-bi, actors Park Joon-geum, Seo Ji-seok, Lee Ah-hyun, Jin Ji-hee and speed skater Lee Kyou-hyuk. The winner of the show was Krystal and her partner Lee Dong-hoon. The runner up was Kim Byung-man and his partner Lee Soo-kyung. As a reward, Krystal and Lee Dong-hoon got to showcase their skating with Kim in the All That Skate exhibition that was held in August 2011.

Awards and honors

Kim has received numerous accolades in recognition of her achievements and impact. She was honored in the sports category at the Republic of Korea National Assembly Awards in 2006, and later received an Achievement Award in 2011. She was awarded the Talent Medal of Korea in 2008. In August 2010, in honor of Kim's visit, the city of Los Angeles designated August 7 as "Yu-Na Kim Day" and granted her honorary citizenship. She also received the Proud Korean Award from the Korean American Leadership Foundation. Kim received the Sportswoman of the Year Award from the Women's Sports Foundation later that year.

In 2012, Kim was awarded the Peony Medal (Moran) in recognition of her contributions to the 2018 Pyeongchang bid. It is the second-highest grade in South Korea's Order of Civil Merit. She was later awarded the Blue Dragon Medal (Cheongnyong) at the 54th Korea Sports Awards in October 2016. The medal is the highest decoration in the Order of Sports Merit. Kim was not originally eligible for the honor, having already received a different order less than seven years prior, but an exception was made in light of her achievements. She became the youngest and only winter sports athlete to be inducted into the Korean Sports Hall of Fame the subsequent month. Following the 2018 Winter Olympics, she received the Outstanding Performance Award at the ANOC Awards. Kim received the Korea Image Cornerstone Award at the 19th Korea Image Awards alongside Lee Jung-jae and Hwang Sun-woo on January 11, 2023.

Kim has been featured in various lists, including the Time 100 (2010) and Forbes 30 Under 30 (2016). She was the first person to top the Forbes Korea Power Celebrity 40, which she did in 2009 and 2010, and appeared in the top 10 on six other occasions (2011–2015, 2018).

Philanthropy and activism

Kim has donated more than 5 billion won to various charitable causes, as of February 2022. In July 2010, she was named an international UNICEF Goodwill Ambassador, with a stated aim of helping vulnerable children around the world. In September 2010, she was invited to the United Nations' New York headquarters to mark the annual International Day of Peace celebration alongside high level UN officials, including UN Secretary-General Ban Ki-moon, and Goodwill Ambassadors representing other branches of the United Nations. There, she advocated peace messages on behalf of UNICEF. Kim is a member of UNICEF's Honors Club, a group for major donors. She was named an ambassador for the 2010 G-20 Seoul summit alongside actress Han Hyo-joo and soccer player representative Park Ji-sung. First lady Kim Yoon-ok appointed her an ambassador for the 2010–2012 Visit Korea Year, promoting Korean tourism as part of a three year campaign.

Kim has funded multiple scholarships for aspiring figure skaters in South Korea, and donated the proceeds from her 2011 duet with IU, "Ice Flower", to the national figure skating team. She commented: "I know how hard it is to be a skater. Even if there were a young, talented skater, she might be forced to give up skating because of financial trouble. I'd like to help her and others reach their goals." Kim donated the prize money from the 2011 World Championships to children affected by the 2011 Japan earthquake; the competition had been scheduled to be held in Japan before being reassigned to Russia as a result of the disaster. She has also aided relief efforts in Nepal, Haiti and the Philippines. In 2014, she donated 100 million won to the families of the victims of the Sewol ferry disaster, in addition to the proceeds from her retirement medal. During the COVID-19 pandemic, she made several donations to help provide vaccines to developing countries and conduct treatment initiatives. On March 7, 2022, Kim donated 100 million won to the Hope Bridge Disaster Relief Association to help the victims of the massive wildfire that started in Uljin, Gyeongbuk and spread to Samcheok, Gangwon.

In September 2022, she participated in a "women roundtable" held at the residence of the US Ambassador in Seoul by Kamala Harris to discuss gender equality, and the stories of Korean women having achieved parity with male rivals in their respective fields. The participants included Naver CEO Choi Soo-yeon, Kim Sagwa, Youn Yuh-jung and the head of the Korean Medical Women's Association Baik Hyun-wook. In December 2022, she was appointed an honorary ambassador for the 60th anniversary of the establishment of diplomatic ties between South Korea and Canada. Kim was selected for the role by the Canadian Embassy in Seoul due to her years spent training in Canada. She will participate in various activities throughout 2023 to promote the relationship between the two countries.

On February 10, 2023, Kim donated $100,000 (approximately 127 million won) to provide emergency relief for children affected by the 2023 Turkey–Syria earthquake. She will also donate the proceeds from the sale of portraits depicting her skating career, painted by David Jamin for his 'Star of Korea' series, to an earthquake relief organization.

Personal life
Kim became a Roman Catholic in 2008 after a devout Catholic doctor helped heal severe skating injuries incurred in 2006–2007. Her confirmation name is Stella from "Stella Maris" in Latin, meaning Our Lady, Star of the Sea, an ancient title of The Blessed Virgin Mary. She often makes the sign of the cross during competitions and wears a rosary ring. On July 25, 2022, it was confirmed that Kim would marry singer Ko Woo-rim of Forestella, with whom she had been in a relationship for three years. They married in a private ceremony on October 22, 2022, at Hotel Shilla in Seoul.

Discography

Singles

As lead artist

As featured artist

Records and achievements

 Former world record holder for the ladies' combined total score. Kim set the record three times and held the record for the longest time from March 28, 2009, to January 27, 2017, under the historical +3 GOE system.
 Former world record holder for the ladies' short program score. Kim set the record five times and held the record for the longest time from March 23, 2007, to March 27, 2014, under the historical +3 GOE system.
 Former world record holder for the ladies' free skate score. Kim set the record three times and held the record for the longest time from November 24, 2007, to April 2, 2016, under the historical +3 GOE system.
 First and only figure skater to have never finished off the podium in her entire career under the current ISU judging system.
 First figure skater to achieve a Super Slam under the current ISU judging system. She is the first ladies' singles skater to win gold in all major ISU championship titles including the Junior Grand Prix Series and Final, World Junior Championships, Grand Prix Series and Final, Four Continents Championships, World Championships, and Winter Olympic Games.
 First female skater to break the 200-point, 210-point, and 220-point mark in the ladies' combined total in international competition (2009 World Championships, 2009 Trophée Eric Bompard, 2010 Winter Olympics).
 First female skater to break the 140-point and 150-point mark in the ladies' free skate total in international competition (2010 Winter Olympics).
 First female skater to break the 75-point mark in the ladies' short program in international competition (2009 World Championships).

World record scores
Kim has broken world records 13 times in her career in the +3/-3 GOE judging system, including two historical junior records.

Programs

Post-2014

Pre-2014

Competitive highlights

Detailed results

Senior level in +3/-3 GOE system

Junior level in +3/-3 GOE system

Novice level in 6.0 system

References

External links

 

! colspan="3" style="border-top: 5px solid #78FF78;" |World Records Holder

! colspan="3" style="border-top: 5px solid #78FF78;" |World Junior Records Holder

1990 births
Living people
21st-century South Korean women writers
Converts to Roman Catholicism
Figure skaters at the 2010 Winter Olympics
Figure skaters at the 2014 Winter Olympics
Four Continents Figure Skating Championships medalists
Korea University alumni
Medalists at the 2010 Winter Olympics
Medalists at the 2014 Winter Olympics
Olympic cauldron lighters
Olympic figure skaters of South Korea
Olympic gold medalists for South Korea
Olympic medalists in figure skating
Olympic silver medalists for South Korea
People from Bucheon
Recipients of the Talent Award of Korea
Season-end world number one figure skaters
South Korean expatriate sportspeople in Canada
South Korean female single skaters
South Korean Roman Catholics
Sportspeople from Gyeonggi Province
UNICEF Goodwill Ambassadors
World Figure Skating Championships medalists
World Junior Figure Skating Championships medalists